The Dance of Time or more literally The Dance of the Clock Hands (Italian: La danza delle lancette) is a 1936 Italian sports comedy film directed by Mario Baffico and starring  Marcello Spada, Ugo Ceseri and Luigi Almirante. It was one of only three films which the leading lady Barbara Monis appeared in.

It was shot at the Cines Studios in Rome. The film's sets were designed by the art director Giorgio Pinzauti.

Synopsis
A young nobleman takes up motor racing despite the disapproval of his father. After a number of obstacles are overcome, he eventually triumphs at the Tripoli Grand Prix in Italian Libya. In the process he has met the girl of his dreams.

Cast

References

Bibliography 
 Enrico Lancia & Roberto Poppi. Le attrici: dal 1930 ai giorni nostri. Gremese Editore, 2003.

External links 
 

1936 films
Italian sports comedy films
Italian black-and-white films
1930s sports comedy films
1930s Italian-language films
Films directed by Mario Baffico
Cines Studios films
Films set in Libya
Italian auto racing films
Films based on Italian novels
1930s Italian films